Ezzat Ebrahim-Nejad (also Ezzat Ebrahimnejad) was an Iranian student, poet and demonstrator who was shot and killed in the attack by security forces on Tehran University dormitory that preceded and provoked the July 1999 student riots in Iran.

Several other students were beaten and injured in the attack and some police were later brought to trial, but no trial has been held for Ebrahim-Nejad's killer, who according to witnesses was a lebas-shakhsis, or plainclothesman, a "shorthand" term for "paramilitary forces in civilian clothes."   According to Iranian human rights activist Shirin Ebadi, it was Ebrahim-Nejad who was the owner of the blood-stained shirt held aloft by Ahmad Batebi in a celebrated photo which appeared on the cover of The Economist magazine in 1999.

Life
In 1998, he graduated from the Shahid Chamran University of Ahvaz School of Law.

Shirin Ebadi, who worked as Ebrahim-Nejad family's pro bono lawyer, described Ebrahim-Nejad as "talented, hardworking, and ambitious" and his father as willing "to sell his small house in the provinces to hire a lawyer to pursue his son's killers." The family also complained to Ebadi of harassment - having stones thrown at them by vigilantes when they attempted to visit their son's grave and being barred from government offices in the wake of the tragedy.

According to Ebadi, after much delay over who had jurisdiction over Ezzat's case, the revolutionary court dismissed it "since no people had officially been charged and since Ezzat was dead anyway."

In 2009, it was reported that his grave at Behesht-e Zahra had been replaced, removing his cause of death.

See also
 List of unsolved murders

References and notes

Sources
 Payvand's Iran News ...1/25/01  Majlis commission receives complaints on various cases 
 Ebadi, Shirin, Iran Awakening, by Shirin Ebadi with Azadeh Moaveni, Random House New York, 2006, p. 156-7

1975 births
1999 deaths
Iranian activists
Iranian murder victims
Male murder victims
People murdered in Iran
Unsolved murders in Iran
People shot dead by law enforcement officers